The 1983 Madrid City Council election, also the 1983 Madrid municipal election, was held on Sunday, 8 May 1983, to elect the 2nd City Council of the municipality of Madrid. All 57 seats in the City Council were up for election. The election was held simultaneously with regional elections in thirteen autonomous communities and local elections all throughout Spain.

The Spanish Socialist Workers' Party (PSOE) won with an absolute majority of 30 councillors and 48.7% of the vote, the only time to date it would do so. The People's Coalition, the electoral alliance led by the People's Alliance (AP) and including the People's Democratic Party (PDP) and the Liberal Union (UL), consolidated its gains made in the 1982 Spanish general election and emerged as the second political force in the city, with 38.0% and 23 seats in the City Council. Meanwhile, the Communist Party of Spain (PCE) vote fell as a result of PSOE's growth, losing over half of its councillors down to 4. The Union of the Democratic Centre (UCD) had collapsed in the October general election and was disbanded in early 1983. Several UCD split parties such as Liberal Democratic Party (PDL) or former Prime Minister Adolfo Suárez' Democratic and Social Centre (CDS) contested the election but failed to win any representation.

As a result of the election, Enrique Tierno Galván, was re-elected as Mayor of Madrid for a second term in office. Tierno Galván would die halfway throughout his term of natural causes, being substituted by party colleague Juan Barranco.

Electoral system
The City Council of Madrid was the top-tier administrative and governing body of the municipality of Madrid, composed of the mayor, the government council and the elected plenary assembly.

Voting for the local assembly was on the basis of universal suffrage, which comprised all nationals over 18 years of age, registered in the municipality of Madrid and in full enjoyment of their civil and political rights. Local councillors were elected using the D'Hondt method and a closed list proportional representation, with an electoral threshold of five percent of valid votes—which included blank ballots—being applied in each local council. Councillors were allocated to municipal councils based on the following scale:

The mayor was indirectly elected by the plenary assembly. A legal clause required that mayoral candidates earned the vote of an absolute majority of councillors, or else the candidate of the most-voted party in the assembly was to be automatically appointed to the post. In the event of a tie, the eldest one would be elected.

The electoral law allowed for parties and federations registered in the interior ministry, coalitions and groupings of electors to present lists of candidates. Parties and federations intending to form a coalition ahead of an election were required to inform the relevant Electoral Commission within fifteen days of the election call, whereas groupings of electors needed to secure the signature of at least one-thousandth of the electorate in the constituencies for which they sought election—with a compulsory minimum of 500 signatures—disallowing electors from signing for more than one list of candidates.

Opinion polls
The tables below list opinion polling results in reverse chronological order, showing the most recent first and using the dates when the survey fieldwork was done, as opposed to the date of publication. Where the fieldwork dates are unknown, the date of publication is given instead. The highest percentage figure in each polling survey is displayed with its background shaded in the leading party's colour. If a tie ensues, this is applied to the figures with the highest percentages. The "Lead" column on the right shows the percentage-point difference between the parties with the highest percentages in a poll.

Voting intention estimates
The table below lists weighted voting intention estimates. Refusals are generally excluded from the party vote percentages, while question wording and the treatment of "don't know" responses and those not intending to vote may vary between polling organisations. When available, seat projections determined by the polling organisations are also displayed below (or in place of) the voting estimates in a smaller font; 29 seats were required for an absolute majority in the City Council of Madrid.

Voting preferences
The table below lists raw, unweighted voting preferences.

Results

Notes

References
Opinion poll sources

Other

Madrid
Elections in Madrid
City Council election, 1983
Madrid City Council election